Whakatāne Seamount (also known as Whakatāne Volcano) is a submarine stratovolcano situated some  off the Bay of Plenty coastline of New Zealand. It is found within the Kermadec Arc, and is one of the northernmost volcanoes of the Taupō Volcanic Zone and is usually recognised as the most southern of the South Kermadec Ridge Seamounts.

See also
List of volcanoes in New Zealand

References

Taupō Volcanic Zone
Seamounts of New Zealand
Submarine volcanoes
Volcanoes of New Zealand